Neil Wilson (born 26 June 1978) is a British former competitive figure skater. He is a three-time British national champion in men's singles (1997, 2000, and 2003) and reached the free skate at nine ISU Championships – two World Championships, four European Championships, and three World Junior Championships.

Career 
Wilson began skating at age eight after a rink opened near his home. He competed at three World Junior Championships, achieving his best result, sixth, in 1997 in Seoul, South Korea. He also competed at four World Championships – best result: 20th at the 1996 Worlds in Edmonton, Alberta — and four European Championships, obtaining his best result, 13th, at the 1999 Europeans in Prague, Czech Republic. Wilson defeated Steven Cousins to win the 1997 British Championships, held in November 1996. He would go on to win two more senior national titles.

In 1997, Wilson entered the Guinness Book of World Records for the most rotations in an upright spin — he performed a forward scratch spin with 60 uninterrupted rotations. His coaches included Philip and Sue Walsh and then Kevin Bursey in Ayr, Scotland. In June 2001, he moved to Vancouver, British Columbia, where his coach became Joanne McLeod.

Wilson retired from competition after the 2004 World Championships in Dortmund. He became a figure skating coach and choreographer at the BC Center of Excellence in Burnaby, British Columbia. He has worked with Kevin Reynolds, Jeremy Ten, and Kelsey Wong.

Programmes

Competitive highlights 
GP: Champions Series/Grand Prix

References

External links
 

1978 births
British male single skaters
Living people
Sportspeople from Belfast
Figure skaters from Northern Ireland